"When the Stars Go Blue" is a popular alternative country song composed and originally recorded by solo artist and former Whiskeytown band member Ryan Adams. It was first released on his album Gold on September 25, 2001, and has been described as the "most gorgeous ballad" on that album. "When the Stars Go Blue" has been covered by many artists, including Irish band the Corrs (featuring Bono of U2), country music singer Tim McGraw, and Norwegian artists Venke Knutson and Kurt Nilsen as a duo.

Personnel
Ryan Adams - vocals, acoustic guitar
Richard Causon - piano
Ethan Johns - 12 string guitar, harmonium, electric piano, mandocello, Chamberlain strings, drums
Julianna Raye - background vocals

The Corrs version

Irish band the Corrs recorded the song on their album VH1 Presents: The Corrs, Live in Dublin, featuring U2's Bono. The cover was released on April 15, 2002, in the United States, reaching number 11 on the Billboard Adult Alternative Airplay chart and number 18 on the Adult Top 40. The song was remixed for their album Dreams: The Ultimate Corrs Collection in 2006.

Charts

Release history

Tim McGraw version

In 2006, the song was released by Tim McGraw as the first single from his compilation album Tim McGraw Reflected: Greatest Hits Vol. 2.  Heribert Severing, creator and writer of severing.nu, included McGraw's version of "When the Stars Go Blue" on his list of the top Country singles of 2006.

Chart performance
"When the Stars Go Blue" debuted at number 35 on the U.S. Billboard Hot Country Songs for the week of March 18, 2006.

Certifications

Venke Knutson and Kurt Nilsen version

Norwegian singers Venke Knutson and World Idol Kurt Nilsen recorded a duet that appears in Venke Knutson's album 2005 Places I Have Been. The song was released as a single in Norway in February 2006, reaching number 14 on the Norwegian Singles Chart.

Other versions
Irish/British girlband Wonderland performed the track for their debut performance on television in Ireland. The recorded studio version was included the band's debut album Wonderland.

It was also featured in One Tree Hill as a hit song by fictional characters Haley James Scott and Chris Keller (real life singers Bethany Joy Lenz and Tyler Hilton) and features on the One Tree Hill Soundtrack. 

The song was performed by Blake Lewis on American Idol Season 6, originally airing on April 17, 2007. His cover of the song made it to #92 of the pop charts in 2007.

On July 16, 2006, Phil Lesh covered the song in the first set of a show at Charter One Pavilion in Chicago, Illinois. The show was made available for purchase via compact disc by Phil Lesh and Friends. On April 5, 2014, Lesh covered the song in the first set of a show at the Capitol Theatre in Port Chester, New York.

In popular culture
The song inspired a novel of the same name.

References

2001 songs
2002 singles
2006 singles
Ryan Adams songs
Tim McGraw songs
The Corrs songs
Song recordings produced by Mitchell Froom
Song recordings produced by Byron Gallimore
Song recordings produced by Tim McGraw
Pop ballads
Rock ballads
Country ballads
143 Records singles
Atlantic Records singles
Curb Records singles
Lava Records singles
Music videos directed by Sherman Halsey
Songs written by Ryan Adams